Yalode is the largest confirmed crater on Ceres after Kerwan. It is adjacent to another large crater, Urvara. It is named after the Dahomeyan deity of the yam harvest, Yalodé. It appears to have a series of canyons running from it, in a northwestern direction. These may be ejecta from it. The canyons have been collectively named Samhain Catena.

See also
List of geological features on Ceres
Dawn (spacecraft), the spacecraft used to discover Yalode crater

References

Impact craters on asteroids
Surface features of Ceres